Al-Jalama may refer to:

 al-Jalamah, Syria, a Syrian village in Hama Governorate
 Jalamah, a Palestinian village in Jenin Governorate
 Al-Jalama, Haifa, a depopulated Palestinian village southeast of Haifa
 Al-Jalama, Tulkarm, a depopulated Palestinian village in the Tulkarm Subdistrict